Eula Whitehouse (1892–1974) was an American botanist, botanical illustrator, and plant collector known for gathering specimens from Africa, Hawaii, Australia, New Zealand, Cyprus, India, Singapore, Fiji, and Mexico. She worked at Southern Methodist University variously as a botany professor, head of the herbarium, and curator of cryptogams.  Her collection of botanical books formed an initial part of the library at the Botanical Research Institute of Texas.

References 

1892 births
1974 deaths
American women scientists
American botanists
20th-century American women
20th-century American people